Adda-Douéni  is a small town on the island of Anjouan in the Comoros. According to the 1991 census the town had a population of 6,171. The current estimate for 2009 is 10,858 people

References

Populated places in Anjouan